Gerd Theißen (or Theissen; born 24 April 1943) is a German Protestant theologian and New Testament scholar. He is Professor of New Testament Theology at the University of Heidelberg.

Early life and education
Theissen obtained his doctorate in theology in Protestant theology from the University of Bonn in 1968. He then took a position studying Evangelical Theology at the University of Bonn.  He obtained his habilitation in 1972 in Bonn, with a form-critical work on early Christian miracle stories.

Academic career
He was a lecturer at the University of Bonn from 1973 to 1978. In 1978, he became professor at the University of Copenhagen. Since 1980 he has been a professor at the University of Heidelberg. From 2007 to September 2009 he was secretary of the Philosophical class of the Heidelberg Academy of Sciences.

In 2002, he was awarded the Burkitt Medal by the British Academy. It is granted 'in recognition of special service to Biblical Studies'.

Personal life
Theissen is married to psychotherapist Dr. Christa Schaible. They have two children.

Work
His Sociology of early Palestinian Christianity (1978) is useful for interpreting intertestamental literature.

Theissen received the Burkitt Medal for Biblical Studies in 2002 from The British Academy. According to the British Academy's citation, Theissen is:

"... one of the earliest pioneers in the application of the principles and methods of sociology to the study of the New Testament. Notable works in this field are The First Followers of Jesus: A Sociological Analysis of the Earliest Christians (which concentrated on conditions in Palestine) and The Social Setting of Primitive Christianity (a Pauline study dealing mainly with Corinth)."

the citation goes on to say that

"... Prof. Theissen is not simply a sociologist. He has never ceased to be a theologian, who has always emphasised the theological as well as the historical significance of his sociological studies and has written specifically on the meaning of faith. A Critical Faith and Biblical Faith: an Evolutionary Approach are particularly important in this respect. But his recent publications also include The Religion of the Earliest Churches, Gospel Writing and Church Politics: a Socio-rhetorical Approach, and The Shadow of the Galilean. This last is a most unusual life of Jesus, accessible to any intelligent reader, but based on the strictest critical discipline."

His works are translated into more than ten languages, both European and Asian languages.

Bibliography

 Books translated in English
 The Miracle Stories of the Early Christian Tradition (1974), Fortress Press, 1983, 
 Sociology of Early Palestinian Christianity (1977), Fortress Press, 1978, 
 also published as: The First Followers of Jesus: A Sociological Analysis of the Earliest Christianity (1977), SCM Press, 1978, 
 A Critical Faith: A Case for Religion (1978), Philadelphia: Fortress Press, 1979, 
 also published as: On having a Critical Faith, London: SCM Press 1979
 The Social Setting of Pauline Christianity: Essays on Corinth (1979), Philadelphia: Fortress Press 1982 (reprint: Wipf & Stock, 2004), 
 also published as: The Social Reality and the Early Christians: Theology, Ethics and the World of the New Testament (1979), Minneapolis: Fortress 1992 (reprint T. & T. Clark, 1999), 
 Psychological Aspects of Pauline Theology (1983), Philadelphia: Fortress Press 1987 (reprint: T. & T. Clark, 1999, 
 Biblical Faith: An Evolutionary Approach (1984), Fortress Press, 1985, 
 The Shadow of the Galilean: The Quest of the Historical Jesus in Narrative Form (1986), Fortress Press, 1987; Updated edition 2007, .
 The Gospels in Context: Social and Political History in the Synoptic Tradition (1989), Minneapolis: Fortress 1991 (reprint: T. & T. Clark, 1999), 
 The Open Door: Variations on Biblical Theme (1990), Fortress Press, 1991, 
 The Sign Language of Faith. Opportunities for Preaching Today (1994), SCM Press, 1995, 
 Traces of Light: Sermons and Bible Studies (1994), SCM Press, 1996, 
 Gerd Theissen, Annette Merz, The Historical Jesus: A Comprehensive Guide (1996), Augsburg Fortress, 1998, 
 Gerd Theissen, Dagmar Winter, The Quest for the Plausible Jesus: The Question of Criteria (1997), Westminster John Knox Press, 2002, 
 Signs of Life (1998), SCM Press, 1998, 
 The Religion of the Earliest Churches: Creating a Symbolic World (1999), Fortress Press, 1999, 
 A Theory of Primitive Christian Religion (2000), SCM Press, 1999, 
 Gospel Writing and Church Politics: A Socio-rhetorical Approach (Chuen King Lecture Series - CKLS 3 Chung Chi College: The Chinese University of Hong Kong), 2001 
 The New Testament: History, Literature, Religion (2002), T & T Clark, 2003, 
 Wolfgang Stegemann, Bruce J. Malina, Gerd Theissen (eds.), The Social Setting of Jesus and the Gospels, Fortress Press, 2002, 
 The Bible and Contemporary Culture (2003), Fortress Press, 2007, 
 The New Testament: A Literary History (2007), Fortress Press, 2011, 

 Books not translated
 Untersuchungen zum Hebräerbrief, Gütersloh: Mohn, 1969
 Jesus als historische Gestalt. Beiträge zur Jesusforschung, Göttingen: Vandenhoeck, 2003
 Gerd Theissen, P.v. Gemünden, M. Konradt, Der Jakobusbrief. Beiträge zur Rehabilitierung der „strohernen Epistel“ , Münster: LIT, 2003
 Die Jesusbewegung. Sozialgeschichte einer Revolution der Werte, Gütersloh: Kaiser, 2004
 Erleben und Verhalten der ersten Christen. Eine Psychologie des Urchristentums, Gütersloh: Gütersloher Verlagshaus, 2007
 "Regards psychologiques et sociologiques sur le christianisme primitif: cinq études de Gerd Theissen", Études théologiques et religieuses 83 (2008)
 "Neutestamentliche Wissenschaft vor und nach 1945: Karl Georg Kuhn und Günther Bornkamm", Schriften der Philosophisch-historischen Klasse der Heidelberger Akademie der Wissenschaften 47, Heidelberg: Winter, 2009
 "Von Jesus zur urchristlichen Zeichenwelt", "Neutestamentliche Grenzgänge“ im Dialog, Göttingen: Vandenhoeck, 2011
 Die Ritualdynamik urchristlicher Sakramente. Von prophetischen Zeichenhandlungen zu geheimnisvollen Riten, = La dinamica rituale dei sacramenti nel cristianesimo primitivo. Da azioni simbolico profetiche a riti misterici, Lectiones Vagagginianae IV, Rom: Cittadella Editrice e Pontificio Ateneo Sant'Anselmo, 2013
 Polyphones Verstehen. Entwürfe zur Bibelhermeneutik, Münster: LIT, 2014
 Transparente Erfahrung: Predigten und Meditationen, Gütersloh, Gütersloher Verlagshaus 2014
 Polyphones Verstehen: Entwürfe zur Bibelhermeneutik, Münster: LIT, 2015
 Gerd Theissen, Petra von Gemünden, Der Römerbrief. Rechenschaft eines Reformators, Göttingen: Vandenhoeck 2016
 Gerd Theissen, Lung Pun Chan, István Czachesz, Kontraintuitivität und Paradoxie. Zum kognitiven Ansatz in der Exegese, BVB 29, Münster: LIT 2017
 Veränderungspräsenz und Tabubruch. Die Ritualdynamik urchristlicher Sakramente, BVB 30, Münster: LIT 2017
 Der Anwalt des Paulus, Gütersloh, Gütersloher Verlagshaus 2017
 Glaubenssätze: ein kritischer Katechismus, Gütersloh, Gütersloher Verlagshaus 2018
 Texttranszendenz, Beiträge zur polyphonen Hermeneutik, Münster: LIT 2019
 Urchristliche Wundergeschichten: ein Beitrag zur formgeschichtlichen Erforschung der synoptischen Evangelien, Gütersloh, Gütersloher Verlagshaus 2019
 Beiträge zu einer polyphonen Bibelhermeneutik, Münster: LIT 2019
 Religionskritik als Religionsdiskurs: Plädoyer für einen postsäkularen Dialog, Stuttgart: Alfred Kröner Verlag 2020
 Resonanztheologie: Gott, Christus, Geist,  Münster: LIT 2020
 Gerd Theissen, Sylvia Thonak, Militärseelsorge: das ungeliebte Kind protestantischer Friedensethik? : Konzepte und Probleme, Münster: LIT, 2020 
 Kirchenträume - Kirche in urchristlicher Zeit und Gegenwart, Münster: LIT, 2021

Notes

External links 

 List of Publications

1943 births
20th-century German Protestant theologians
21st-century German Protestant theologians
Critics of the Christ myth theory
German biblical scholars
German male non-fiction writers
Living people
New Testament scholars